The Miller Research Fellows program is the central program of the Adolph C. and Mary Sprague Miller Institute for Basic Research in Science on the University of California Berkeley campus.  The program constitutes the support of Research Fellows - a group of the world's most brilliant young scientists. Each year, eight to ten Miller Research Fellows are chosen from hundreds of nominations in all areas of science based on the promise of their scientific research. The Fellowships are three-year appointments, during which the young scientists launch their careers, being mentored by Berkeley's faculty and making use of the facilities at the university. A few Fellows stay on as new Berkeley faculty. Most move on to contribute to faculty positions at other reputed institutions around the world.  Other comparable programs are the Harvard Junior Fellows and the Junior Fellowship Program at the University of Cambridge. To date, there have been over 500 Miller Fellows from all areas of science since the inception of the program in 1960. Carl Sagan was among the first group of Fellows in the program. Along with the Miller Fellows, the Miller Institute also supports Miller Professorships for selected Berkeley faculty, Miller Visiting Professorships, and Miller Senior Fellows. In all, the institute has supported more than 1000 scientists, including multiple Nobel Prize winners, nine Fields Medalists and dozens of National Academy of Sciences members.

Notable Fellows 

 Carl Sagan:  1960 – 1962, Astronomy
 Dorian Goldfeld: 1969 – 1971, Mathematics
 Adrian Bejan: 1976 – 1978, Mechanical Engineering
 Steven Clarke: 1976 – 1978, Biochemistry
 Reinhard Genzel: 1980 – 1982, Physics
 Stevo Todorčević: 1983 – 1985, Mathematics
 Alexei Filippenko: 1984 – 1986, Astronomy
 Grigori Perelman: 1993 – 1995, Mathematics
 Michael Manga: 1994 – 1996, Geophysics
 Safi R. Bahcall: 1995 – 1997, Physics
 Adam Riess: 1996 – 1998, Astronomy
 Santosh Vempala: 1998–1999, Computer Science
 Venkatesan Guruswami: 2001 – 2002, Computer Science

See also 
 List of Miller Research Fellows

References 

Fellowships
University of California, Berkeley
1960 establishments in California